Starosemenkino is a rural locality (a selo) and the administrative centre of Semenkinsky Selsoviet, Belebeyevsky District, Bashkortostan, Russia. The population was 437 as of 2010. There are 8 streets.

Geography 
Starosemenkino is located 32 km northeast of Belebey (the district's administrative centre) by road. Karanay is the nearest rural locality.

References 

Rural localities in Belebeyevsky District